Troublesome may refer to:

 Troublesome, Colorado, a community in the United States
 Troublesome Valley, a valley in West Virginia
 "Troublesome", a 2022 song by No Money Enterprise and Section 60

See also
 Troublesome Creek (disambiguation)